Arthur Thomas Grosvenor (22 November 1908 – 31 October 1972) was an English professional footballer who played as an inside right. He played more than 100 games for Birmingham (now Birmingham City) in the Football League First Division and won three full caps for England. His brother Percy Grosvenor played for West Bromwich Albion and Leicester City.

Born in the Netherton area of Dudley, Worcestershire, Grosvenor started his football career with Stourbridge before moving to Birmingham in 1928. His early career was disrupted by injury, but once fit he took over at inside right and creator of chances when the ageing Johnny Crosbie moved on. In all he made 115 first team appearances for Birmingham and played three times for England in 1933, scoring twice. After leaving Birmingham he had short spells at Sheffield Wednesday and Bolton Wanderers 1937 to 1938, finishing up at local club Dudley Town in 1938. After football, he became a sheet-metal worker. He died in 1972 at the age of 63.

References

External links

1908 births
Sportspeople from Dudley
1972 deaths
English footballers
England international footballers
Association football inside forwards
Stourbridge F.C. players
Birmingham City F.C. players
Sheffield Wednesday F.C. players
Bolton Wanderers F.C. players
English Football League players
Place of death missing
Sheet metal workers
English Football League representative players
Dudley Town F.C. players